Matthew John Fuchter  is a British chemist who is a Professor of Chemistry at Imperial College London. His research focuses on the development and application of novel functional molecular systems to a broad range of areas; from materials to medicine. He has been awarded both the Harrison-Meldola Memorial Prize (2014) and the Corday–Morgan Prizes (2021) of the Royal Society of Chemistry. In 2020 he was a finalist for the Blavatnik Awards for Young Scientists.

Early life and education 
Fuchter earned a master's degree (MSci) in chemistry at the University of Bristol, where he was awarded the Richard Dixon prize. It was during his undergraduate degree that he first became interested in organic synthesis. As a graduate student he moved to Imperial College London, where he worked with Anthony Barrett on the synthesis and applications of porphyrazines, including as therapeutic agents. During his doctoral studies Barrett and Fuchter collaborated with Brian M. Hoffman at Northwestern University.

Research and career 
After completing his PhD, Fuchter moved to Australia, for postdoctoral research at CSIRO and the University of Melbourne, where he worked with Andrew Bruce Holmes.
In 2007 Fuchter returned to the United Kingdom, where he began his independent academic career at the School of Pharmacy, University of London (now UCL School of Pharmacy). Less than one year later he was appointed a Lecturer at Imperial College London, where he was promoted to Reader (Associate Professor) in 2015 and Professor in 2019.

Fuchter is interested in how considerations of chirality can be applied to the development of novel approaches in chiral optoelectronic materials and devices. In particular, he focusses on the introduction of chiral-optical (so-called chiroptical) properties into optoelectronic materials. Amongst these materials, Fuchter has extensively evaluated the use of chiral small molecule additives (helicenes) to induce chiroptical properties into light emitting polymers for the realisation of chiral (circularly polarised, CP) OLEDs. He has also investigated the application of such materials in circularly polarised photodetectors, which are devices that are capable of detecting circularly polarised light. As well as using chiral functional materials for light emission and detection, Fuchter has investigated the charge transport properties of enantiopure and racemic chiral functional materials. 

Fuchter has also developed novel molecular photoswitches – molecules that can be cleanly and reversibly interconverted between two states using light – with a focus on heteroaromatic versions of azobenzene. The arylazopyrazole switches developed by Fuchter out perform the ubiquitous azobenzene switches, demonstrating complete photoswitching in both directions and thermal half-lives of the Z isomer of up to 46 years. Fuchter continues to apply these switches to a range of photoaddressable applications from photopharmacology to energy storage. 

Alongside his work on functional material discovery, Fuchter works in medicinal chemistry and develops small molecule ligands that can either inhibit or stimulate the activity of disease relevant proteins. While he has worked on many drug targets, he has specialised in proteins involved in the transcriptional and epigenetic processes of disease. A particular interest has been the development of inhibitors for the histone-lysine methyltransferase enzymes in the Plasmodium parasite that causes human malaria. 

In 2018 one of the cancer drugs developed by Fuchter, together with Anthony Barrett, Simak Ali and Charles Coombes entered a phase 1 clinical trial, and as of 2020, it is in phase 2. The drug, which was designed using computational chemistry, inhibits the cyclin-dependent kinase 7 (CDK7), a transcriptional regulatory protein that also regulates the cell cycle. Certain cancers rely on CDK7, so inhibition of this enzyme has potential to have a significant impact on cancer pathogenesis.

Academic service 
Fuchter serves on the editorial board of MedChemComm. He is an elected council member of the Royal Society of Chemistry organic division. Fuchter is co-Director of the Imperial College London Centre for Drug Discovery Science.

Awards and honours 
 2014 Royal Society of ChemistryHarrison-Meldola Memorial Prize
 2014 Elected a Fellow of the Royal Society of Chemistry (FRSC)
 2015 Thieme Medical Publishers Chemistry Journal Awardee
 2017 Imperial College London President's Award for Excellence in Research
 2017 Imperial College London President’s Medal for Excellence in Innovation and Entrepreneurship
 2018 Tetrahedron Young Investigator Award
 2018 Engineering and Physical Sciences Research Council (EPSRC) Established career fellowship
 2020 Blavatnik Awards for Young Scientists
2021 Royal Society of Chemistry Corday–Morgan Prize

Selected publications

References 

Living people
Year of birth missing (living people)
British chemists
Alumni of the University of Bristol
Alumni of Imperial College London
Academics of Imperial College London
Medicinal chemistry
Fellows of the Royal Society of Chemistry